Daniel Rodríguez may refer to:
Daniel Rodriguez (fighter) (born 1986), American mixed martial artist 
Daniel Rodríguez (tenor) (born 1964), Puerto Rican-American operatic tenor
Daniel Rodríguez Pérez (born 1977), Spanish retired footballer
Daniel B. Rodriguez, dean and professor at the Northwestern University Pritzker School of Law
Daniel García Rodríguez (born 1987), Spanish footballer
Daniel Rodríguez (baseball) (born 1984), baseball player
Daniel Rodríguez Martín (born 1984), Spanish wheelchair basketball player
Dani Rodríguez (born 1988), Spanish footballer
Daniel Rodríguez (singer), singer with MDO
Coquito (footballer) (born 1965), nickname of Uruguayan footballer Daniel Gregorio Rodríguez Lima
Daniel Rodriguez (muay thai) (born 1998)

See also

Daniel Rodrigues (disambiguation)